The Bizdidel is a left tributary of the river Ialomița in Romania. It discharges into the Ialomița in Brănești.

References

Rivers of Romania
Rivers of Dâmbovița County
Rivers of Prahova County